Heartbreaker Please is the sixth studio album by English musician Teddy Thompson. It was released on 29 May 2020 under Thirty Tigers.

Critical reception

Heartbreaker Please was met with generally favourable reviews from critics. At Metacritic, which assigns a weighted average rating out of 100 to reviews from mainstream publications, this release received an average score of 67, based on 7 reviews.

Track listing

References

2020 albums
Teddy Thompson albums
Thirty Tigers albums